Aorangi Oval (also known as the South Canterbury Athletic Club Ground) is a cricket ground in Timaru, Canterbury, New Zealand.  The first recorded match held on the ground came in 1881 when South Canterbury played the touring Australians.

List A cricket was first held there in the 1980/81 Shell Cup when Canterbury played Wellington.  To date the ground has held a total of fifteen List A matches.  First-class cricket was first played there in February 1998 when Canterbury played the touring Zimbabweans.  Later in November 1998, the Northern Conference played Pakistan A, while in 2003 Canterbury played two further first-class matches there in the 2002/03 State Championship.  Canterbury have also played three Twenty20 matches there.

In 2000, the Aorangi Oval hosted two Women's One Day Internationals between New Zealand Women and England Women. Canterbury Women played State League matches there in 2002 and 2007.

References

External links
Aorangi Oval at ESPNcricinfo
Aorangi Oval at CricketArchive

Cricket grounds in New Zealand